Mathieu Turcotte (born February 8, 1977) is a Canadian former short track speed skater. He was born in Sherbrooke, Quebec.

Turcotte rose to fame within Canada upon winning the bronze in the men's 1000 m in the short track speed skating at the 2002 Winter Olympics, with a time of 1:30.563 (a race more remembered for the victory of Australian Steven Bradbury), and winning a gold as part of the men's 5000 m relay at the same games, with a team time of 6:51.579.

He placed 6th at the men's 1500 m short track speed skating at the 2006 Winter Olympics with a time of 2:24.558.

Mathieu is now the President of Apex Racing Skates, a company that makes custom short track speed skates.

Career

References

1977 births
Canadian male short track speed skaters
French Quebecers
Living people
Medalists at the 2006 Winter Olympics
Medalists at the 2002 Winter Olympics
Olympic bronze medalists for Canada
Olympic gold medalists for Canada
Olympic medalists in short track speed skating
Olympic short track speed skaters of Canada
Olympic silver medalists for Canada
Short track speed skaters at the 2002 Winter Olympics
Short track speed skaters at the 2006 Winter Olympics
Sportspeople from Sherbrooke
Canadian male speed skaters
World Short Track Speed Skating Championships medalists